Rahim-e Kuzhiag (also Romanized as Raḩīm-e Kūzhīāg; also known as Raḩīm-e Kūzhīā) is a village in Obatu Rural District, Karaftu District, Divandarreh County, Kurdistan Province, Iran. At the 2006 census, its population was 81, in 16 families. The village is populated by Kurds.

References 

Towns and villages in Divandarreh County
Kurdish settlements in Kurdistan Province